This is a list of awards and nominations for Curb Your Enthusiasm, an American comedy television series produced and broadcast by HBO that premiered on October 15, 2000.

Directors Guild of America

Eddie Awards
2018: Best Edited Comedy Series for Non-Commercial Television (Jonathan Corn for "The Shucker")

1 win

Emmy Awards
2002: Outstanding Comedy Series
2002: Outstanding Directing for a Comedy Series (Robert B. Weide for "The Doll")
2003: Outstanding Comedy Series
2003: Outstanding Lead Actor in a Comedy Series (Larry David)
2003: Outstanding Supporting Actress in a Comedy Series (Cheryl Hines)
2003: Outstanding Directing for a Comedy Series (Robert B. Weide for "Krazee-Eyez Killa")
2003: Outstanding Directing for a Comedy Series (Larry Charles for "The Nanny From Hell")
2003: Outstanding Directing for a Comedy Series (Bryan Gordon for "The Special Section")
2003: Outstanding Directing for a Comedy Series (David Steinberg for "Mary, Joseph and Larry")
2003: Outstanding Casting for a Comedy Series
2003: Outstanding Single-Camera Picture Editing for a Comedy Series (Jon Corn for "Krazee-Eyez Killa")
2003: Outstanding Single-Camera Picture Editing for a Comedy Series (Steven Rasch for "The Corpse-Sniffing Dog")
2004: Outstanding Comedy Series
2004: Outstanding Lead Actor in a Comedy Series (Larry David)
2004: Outstanding Directing for a Comedy Series (Robert B. Weide for "The Car Pool Lane")
2004: Outstanding Directing for a Comedy Series (Larry Charles for "The Survivor")
2004: Outstanding Directing for a Comedy Series (Bryan Gordon for "The 5 Wood")
2004: Outstanding Casting for a Comedy Series
2004: Outstanding Single-Camera Picture Editing for a Comedy Series (Steven Rasch for "Opening Night")
2004: Outstanding Single-Camera Picture Editing for a Comedy Series (Jon Corn for "The Survivor")
2006: Outstanding Comedy Series
2006: Outstanding Lead Actor in a Comedy Series (Larry David)
2006: Outstanding Supporting Actress in a Comedy Series (Cheryl Hines)
2006: Outstanding Directing for a Comedy Series (Robert B. Weide for "The Christ Nail")
2006: Outstanding Casting for a Comedy Series
2006: Outstanding Single-Camera Picture Editing for a Comedy Series (Steven Rasch for "The Ski Lift")
2008: Outstanding Comedy Series
2008: Outstanding Guest Actor - Comedy Series (Shelley Berman for playing "Nat David")
2008: Outstanding Casting for a Comedy Series
2008: Outstanding Single-Camera Picture Editing for a Comedy Series (Steven Rasch for "The Bat Mitzvah")
2010: Outstanding Comedy Series
2010: Outstanding Lead Actor in a Comedy Series (Larry David)
2010: Outstanding Single-Camera Picture Editing for a Comedy Series (Steve Rasch for "The Bare Midriff")
2010: Outstanding Single-Camera Picture Editing for a Comedy Series (Jonathan Corn and Roger Nygard for "The Table Read")
2012: Outstanding Comedy Series
2012: Outstanding Lead Actor in a Comedy Series (Larry David) 
2012: Outstanding Guest Actor - Comedy Series (Michael J. Fox for playing himself)
2012: Outstanding Directing for a Comedy Series (Robert B. Weide for "Palestinian Chicken") 
2012: Outstanding Single-Camera Picture Editing for a Comedy Series (Steve Rasch for "Palestinian Chicken")
2018: Outstanding Comedy Series
2018: Outstanding Lead Actor in a Comedy Series (Larry David)
2020: Outstanding Comedy Series
2022: Outstanding Comedy Series

2 wins

Golden Globe Award
2002: Best Actor - Musical or Comedy Series (Larry David)
2002: Best Series - Musical or Comedy
2004: Best Actor - Musical or Comedy Series (Larry David)
2005: Best Actor - Musical or Comedy Series(Larry David)
2005: Best Series - Musical or Comedy

1 win

Hollywood Critics Association TV Awards
2022: Best Cable Series, Comedy
2022: Best Actor in a Broadcast Network or Cable Series, Comedy (Larry David)

Image Awards
2004: Outstanding Supporting Actress - Comedy Series (Wanda Sykes)
2005: Outstanding Supporting Actress - Comedy Series (Wanda Sykes)
2007: Outstanding Supporting Actress - Comedy Series (Vivica A. Fox)

Producers Guild of America
2002: Producer of the Year - Episodic Comedy
2004: Producer of the Year - Episodic Comedy
2006: Producer of the Year - Episodic Comedy
2008: Producer of the Year - Episodic Comedy
2010: Producer of the Year - Episodic Comedy
2017: Producer of the Year - Episodic Comedy

2 wins

Screen Actors Guild
2005: Outstanding Actor - Comedy Series (Larry David)
2005: Outstanding Cast - Comedy Series (Shelley Berman, Larry David, Susie Essman, Jeff Garlin, Cheryl Hines, Richard Lewis)
2009: Outstanding Actor - Comedy Series (Larry David)
2009: Outstanding Cast - Comedy Series (Larry David, Susie Essman, Jeff Garlin, Cheryl Hines)
2017: Outstanding Actor - Comedy Series (Larry David)
2017: Outstanding Cast - Comedy Series: (Ted Danson, Larry David, Susie Essman, Jeff Garlin, Cheryl Hines, J. B. Smoove)

Writers Guild of America
2005: Best Writing - Comedy Series (Larry David)
2006: Best Writing - Comedy Series (Larry David)
2007: Best Writing - Comedy Series (Larry David)
2009: Best Writing - Comedy Series (Larry David)
2011: Best Writing - Comedy Series (Alec Berg, Larry David, David Mandel, Jeff Schaffer)
2017: Best Writing - Comedy Series (Larry David, Jon Hayman, Justin Hurwitz, Jeff Schaffer)

1 win

References

Curb Your Enthusiasm